Glyphiulidae, is a family of Round-backed millipedes of the order Spirostreptida. The family includes 112 species belonging to 16 genera.

Genera
 
Agastrophus
Cambalomorpha
Dolichoglyphius
Formosoglyphius
Glyphijulus
Glyphiulus
Hypocambala
Ilyspasticus
Javichus
Nesocambala
Octoglyphus
Plusioglyphiulus
Podoglyphiulus
Trichocambala
Trichonannolene
Trogloglyphus

References

Spirobolida
Millipede families